Liu Jun (926–968), originally Liu Chengjun, was the second emperor of the Shatuo-led Northern Han dynasty of China. His capital was at Taiyuan, Shanxi Province. He was the 2nd son of Liu Chong (also known as Liu Min), the 1st emperor of Northern Han. In 951, after the death of his brother Liu Yun, he became the heir of his father. During his reign, in 960, the Later Zhou dynasty was overthrown and replaced by the Song dynasty. He was given the temple name Ruizong (睿宗) and posthumous name Emperor Xiaohe (孝和皇帝) after his death.

Wife
Empress Guo, died 968

Sons
Liu Ji'en, 3rd emperor of Northern Han
Liu Jiyuan, 4th and last emperor of Northern Han
Liu Jiqing, 3rd son, died 973
Liu Jiwen, adopted nephew, grandson of Liu Chong
5th son, died 973

References

926 births
968 deaths
Northern Han emperors
10th-century Turkic people